Lisa Margaret Lines (born 18 July 1980) is an academic editor, historian, author and former lecturer in history at the University of New South Wales Canberra. She specialises in the history of the Spanish Civil War and the prevalence and influence of plagiarism and academic integrity in higher education.

Education and career
Lines completed a Bachelor of Arts, an Honours degree and a Doctor of Philosophy (PhD) in Creative Writing at the University of Adelaide and a Honours degree and PhD in History at Flinders University. Lines has lectured at Flinders University, the University of Adelaide, the University of South Australia and the University of New South Wales. In 2007, Lines founded Elite Editing, serving as Director and Head Editor until selling the business in 2014. After her tenure at the University of New South Wales, Lines founded Capstone Editing, a specialist academic editing company.

Lines authored a book on milicianas—female participants in the Spanish Civil War—exploring their origins in the Republican reaction to the coup of 1936 and contributions as frontline and rearguard combatants during the first year of the war (after which women were largely removed from combat roles). Lines has also argued for a re-evaluation of General Franco's military leadership, strategy and political acumen during the Spanish Civil War, reasoning that Franco's prolonging of the war was purposefully done to solidify his control of the Nationalist camp, ensure the complete destruction of the Republican forces and establish the foundation for his position as head of state in the post-war years.

Research
Lines has criticised the current climate of Australian universities as overcommercialised, apathetic towards student needs, enabling of a monopolised textbook industry and overpriced textbooks, and unwilling to admit or confront the rising issue of ghostwriting for university students. Lines has also highlighted the under-representation of women in senior levels of academia.

Court case
Lines served as a witness in the attempted murder trial of her ex-partner, Mr Jonathon Hawtin (R v Hawtin in the Supreme Court of South Australia). The trial followed an incident in October 2017, in which Mr Hawtin allegedly attempted to murder Mr Bruckner, with both being severely injured. Hawtin was acquitted by a jury in September 2019.

Publications

Books
Milicianas: Women in Combat in the Spanish Civil War (1936–1939) (Lexington Press, 2011).

Chapters
'Representativeness and Positive Discrimination' in Deane-Peter Baker (ed.), Key Concepts in Military Ethics (UNSW Press, 2015), pp. 56–59.

Journal articles
'General Francisco Franco's Capabilities as a Military Leader during the Spanish Civil War: The Need for a Re-evaluation', Journal of Military History, vol. 81, no. 2, pp. 513–534.
'Female Combatants in the Spanish Civil War: Milicianas on the Front Lines and in the Rearguard', Journal of International Women's Studies, vol. 10, no. 4, pp. 168–187.
'Representations of the Spanish Civil War in Twenty-First Century Anglophone Novels (2000–14)', Journal of War & Culture Studies, vol. 10, no. 2, pp. 150–164.
'Ghostwriters guaranteeing grades? The quality of online ghostwriting services available to tertiary students in Australia', Teaching in Higher Education, vol. 21, no. 8, pp. 513–534.
'Substantive Editing as a Form of Plagiarism among Postgraduate Students in Australia', Assessment & Evaluation in Higher Education, vol. 41, no. 3, pp. 368–383.
'Prostitution in Thailand: Representations in Fiction and Narrative Non-Fiction', Journal of International Women’s Studies, vol. 16, no. 3, pp. 86–100.

References

External links
"Women in Academia": . Commentary and insight by Lines
Dr Lisa Lines, Capstone Editing profile
Dr Lisa Lines, Society for Editors and Proofreaders (SfED) profile

1980 births
Living people
Australian historians
Flinders University alumni
University of Adelaide alumni
Australian military historians
Historians of World War II
Historians of the Spanish Civil War